The 2018–19 Liga TDP season is the fourth-tier football league of Mexico. The tournament began on 7 September 2018 and finished on 15 June 2019.

Competition format 
The Tercera División (Third Division) is divided into 13 groups. For the 2009/2010 season, the format of the tournament has been reorganized to a home and away format, which all teams will play in their respective group. The 13 groups consist of teams who are eligible to play in the liguilla de ascenso for one promotion spot, teams who are affiliated with teams in the Liga MX, Ascenso MX and Liga Premier, which are not eligible for promotion but will play that who the better filial team in an eight team filial playoff tournament for the entire season.

The league format allows participating franchises to rent their place to another team, so some clubs compete with a different name than the one registered with the FA.

Group 1 
Group with 15 teams from Campeche, Chiapas, Quintana Roo, Tabasco and Yucatán.

Teams

League table

Group 2 
Group with 16 teams from Puebla, San Luis Potosí, Tlaxcala and Veracruz.

Teams

League table

Group 3 
Group with 15 teams from Chiapas, Oaxaca and Veracruz.

Teams

League table

Group 4 
Group with 20 teams from Greater Mexico City.

Teams

League table

Group 5 

Group with 16 teams from Mexico City and State of Mexico.

Teams

League table

Group 6 
Group with 12 teams from Guerrero, Mexico City, Morelos, Puebla and State of Mexico.

Teams

League table

Group 7 
Group with 17 teams from Hidalgo, Mexico City, Puebla and State of Mexico.

Teams

League table

Group 8 
Group with 19 teams from Guanajuato, Guerrero, Michoacán and Querétaro.

Teams

League table

Group 9 
Group with 20 teams from Durango, Guanajuato, Jalisco, San Luis Potosí and Zacatecas.

Teams

League table

Group 10 
Group with 20 teams from Colima and Jalisco.

Teams

League table

Group 11 
Group with 15 teams from Jalisco, Nayarit and Sinaloa.

Teams

League table

Group 12 
Group with 20 teams from Coahuila, Nuevo León and Tamaulipas.

Teams

League table

Group 13 
Group with 10 teams from Chihuahua, Coahuila and Sonora.

Teams

League table

Promotion Playoffs
The Promotion Playoffs will consist of seven phases. Classify 64 teams, the number varies according to the number of teams in each group, being between three and six clubs per sector. The country will be divided into two zones: South Zone (Groups I to VII) and North Zone (Groups VIII to XIII). Eliminations will be held according to the average obtained by each group, being ordered from best to worst by their percentage throughout the season.

Round of 64
The first legs were played on 8 and 9 May, and the second legs were played on 11 and 12 May 2019.

South Zone

North Zone

Round of 32
The first legs will be played on 15 and 16 May, and the second legs will be played on 18 and 19 May 2019.

South Zone

North Zone

Final stage
Until the championship series, the teams are divided into two geographical zones: South and North, the participants will be seeded according to their position in the general classification table and their location. In the final series, the winners of each of the two zones will face each other.

Round of 16
The first legs were played on 22 and 23 May, and the second legs will be played on 25 and 26 May 2019.

First leg

Second leg

Quarter-finals
The first legs were played on 29 May, and the second legs will be played on 1 June 2019.

First leg

Second leg

Semi-finals
The first legs were played on 5 June, and the second legs will be played on 8 June 2019.

First leg

Second leg

Final
The first leg was played on 12 June, and the second leg was played on 15 June 2019.

First leg

Second leg

Reserve Teams

Table 

Last updated: May 6, 2019 Source: Liga TDPP = Position; G = Games played; Pts = Points; Pts/G = Ratio of points to games played; GD = Goal difference

Playoffs

Round of 16 
The first legs were played on 10 and 11 May, and the second legs will be played on 17, 18 and 19 May 2019. 

All times are UTC−5 except for matches in Ciudad Juárez and Hermosillo.

First leg

Second leg

Quarter-finals 
The first legs were played on 22 and 23 May, and the second legs were played on 25 and 26 May 2019.

All times are UTC−5 except for match in Ciudad Juárez.

First leg

Second leg

Semi-finals
The first legs will be played on 29 and 30 May 2019, and the second legs will be played on 1 and 2 June 2019.

All times are UTC−5 except for match in Ciudad Juárez.

First leg

Second leg

Final
The first leg was played on 6 June, and the second leg was played on 9 June 2019.

First leg

Second leg

Regular Season statistics

Top goalscorers 
Players sorted first by goals scored, then by last name.

Last updated on May 6, 2019.Source: LigaTDP

See also 
Liga TDP

References

External links 
 Official website of Liga MX

Mx
1